Pavel Aleksandrovich Kondakov (born 27 November 1972) is a former Russian football player.

References

1972 births
Living people
Soviet footballers
Russian footballers
FC Shinnik Yaroslavl players
Russian Premier League players

Association football goalkeepers